David Walton (born 10 April 1973 in Bedlington, Northumberland) is an English retired footballer who is remembered for his exploits at Shrewsbury Town and Crewe Alexandra where he made over 150 league appearances for both clubs.

Club career
Walton began his footballing career with his local North East club Ashlington. After a year at the club, he was offered his first professional contract by Sheffield United at the age of eighteen. He failed to break into the first team at Bramall Lane and after two years in the team youth and reserve sides he was transferred to Shropshire club Shrewsbury Town on his first of two spells at the club. The Englishman enjoyed three years at Gay Meadow making over 100 appearances, scoring twelve goals in all competitions and achieving a Third Division title win with the club during his first year.

In October 1997, Walton was signed by Crewe Alexandra for £500,000, making him the most expensive player in the Railwaymen's history (this record was broken a year later when Rodney Jack was signed for £650,000 from Torquay United). Walton made his Crewe debut in a 1–0 defeat away at Bradford City on 25 October 1997, going on to make 27 further appearances that season. He scored his first Crewe goal, the equaliser in a 1–1 draw at Crystal Palace, on 13 February 1999. In total, the defender spent six seasons at the club, all but one in the second tier Football League First Division and the longest time he had spent at a club in his career. He made 155 league and 16 cup appearances for the south Cheshire club despite a number of injuries. In his last season at the club, Walton helped Crewe to the runners-up spot and promotion from Division Two after making 28 league appearances.

Manager Dario Gradi made his feelings clear that he wished to keep Walton at the club and offered him a new contract. The defender rejected and instead signed a two-year deal with Derby County. However, an injury during pre–season left the Englishman out until October where he made his début in a 2–1 defeat at Norwich City. Walton failed to establish himself in George Burley's first team and was soon loaned out to Stockport County where he made seven league appearances.

After a year at Pride Park, the defender had his contract cancelled by mutual consent. He was soon picked up by his old club Shrewsbury. He added a further 38 league appearances and helped his side survive relegation from the football league. At the start of the 2005–06 season, he was given the role of club captain. Unfortunately, Walton's campaign of marred by injuries and in December 2005 he was forced to retire after sustaining a knee problem.

Career honours

Shrewsbury Town
Winners
1993–1994 Football League Third Division
Runner–up
1995–1996 Football League Trophy

Crewe Alexandra
Runner–up
2002–2003 Football League Second Division

References

External links
 Soccerbase profile
 Article on Crewe Alexandra's Official Website

1973 births
Crewe Alexandra F.C. players
Derby County F.C. players
Living people
People from Bedlington
Footballers from Northumberland
Sheffield United F.C. players
Shrewsbury Town F.C. players
Stockport County F.C. players
Association football defenders
English footballers